

Kuno-Hans von Both (9 April 1884 – 22 May 1955) was a German general during World War II. He was a recipient of both the Pour le Mérite of the German Empire and the Knight's Cross of the Iron Cross of Nazi Germany. He was also awarded the Nazi Party Blood Order by Adolf Hitler for his participation in Nazi activities prior to Adolf Hitler's rise to power.

Awards and decorations
 Order of Franz Joseph (Austria-Hungary, 27 January 1911)
 Lippe House Order, 4th class (18 June 1914)
 Iron Cross 2nd Class (22 September 1914) & 1st Class (9 February 1915)
 Knight's Cross of the Royal House Order of Hohenzollern 3rd Class with Swords (23 December 1917)
 Military Merit Order, 4th class with Swords (Bavaria) (27 June 1918)
 Pour le Mérite (10 April 1918)
 Honour Cross of the World War 1914/1918 (20 December 1934)
 Clasp to the Iron Cross 2nd Class & 1st Class (September 1939)
 German Cross in Gold on 9 September 1942 as General der Infanterie and commander of I. Armeekorps
 Knight's Cross of the Iron Cross on 9 July 1941 as General der Infanterie and commander of I. Armeekorps

References

Citations

Bibliography

 
 
 

1884 births
1955 deaths
People from Saverne
People from Alsace-Lorraine
German Army generals of World War II
Generals of Infantry (Wehrmacht)
German Army personnel of World War I
Recipients of the Order of Franz Joseph
Recipients of the Military Merit Cross (Mecklenburg-Schwerin), 1st class
Recipients of the Pour le Mérite (military class)
Recipients of the Gold German Cross
Recipients of the Knight's Cross of the Iron Cross
German prisoners of war in World War II
Recipients of the clasp to the Iron Cross, 1st class
Reichswehr personnel
20th-century Freikorps personnel